The women's 48 kg judo competitions at the 2022 Commonwealth Games in Birmingham, England took place on August 1st at the Coventry Arena. Geronay Whitebooi of South Africa won the gold medal, beating Shushila Likmabam of India. Katryna Esposito of Malta and Amy Platten of England each won the bronze medal.

Results

Repechages

Source:

References

External link
 
 Results

W52
2022
Commonwealth W48